Felipe Mesones Temperán (9 February 1936 – 15 December 2017) was an Argentine football right winger and coach.

Playing career
Born in Buenos Aires, Mesones spent the vast majority of his career in Spain, representing Real Murcia, Levante UD, CE L'Hospitalet and CE Europa, with all clubs competing in Segunda División. In his native country he appeared for Boca Juniors, San Lorenzo de Almagro and Club Atlético Atlanta, and also had a stint at Independiente Santa Fe in Colombia.

Mesones retired at the end of the 1966–67 season whilst at the service of Catalonia-based Europa, eventually amassing totals of 124 games and 16 goals in the second level.

Coaching career
As a manager, Mesones worked in the Spanish La Liga for nine campaigns, adding another 15 in the second tier. On 27 April 1980, whilst at the service of UD Salamanca, he was involved in a match fixing incident also involving Málaga CF which resulted in a two-year ban for himself and opposing players Raúl Castronovo and Julio Orozco.

In late January 2000, while in training with his club Granada CF, 64-year-old Mesones suffered a heart attack and was admitted to intensive care unit. His last spell consisted of nine games with Cartagonova FC, in Segunda División B.

Death
Mesones died on 15 December 2017 at the age of 81 in Murcia, after a long battle with illness.

References

External links

Historia de Boca profile 

1936 births
2017 deaths
Footballers from Buenos Aires
Argentine footballers
Association football wingers
Argentine Primera División players
Boca Juniors footballers
San Lorenzo de Almagro footballers
Club Atlético Atlanta footballers
Categoría Primera A players
Independiente Santa Fe footballers
Segunda División players
Real Murcia players
Levante UD footballers
CE L'Hospitalet players
CE Europa footballers
Argentine expatriate footballers
Expatriate footballers in Colombia
Expatriate footballers in Spain
Argentine expatriate sportspeople in Colombia
Argentine expatriate sportspeople in Spain
Argentine football managers
La Liga managers
Segunda División managers
Segunda División B managers
Real Murcia managers
CD Tenerife managers
Elche CF managers
Hércules CF managers
UD Salamanca managers
Real Valladolid managers
Granada CF managers
Real Betis managers
Xerez CD managers
Argentine expatriate football managers
Expatriate football managers in Spain